Usady is a rural locality (a village) in Gus-Khrustalny District, Posyolok Dobryatino, Vladimir Oblast, Russia. The population was 40 as of 2010.

Geography 
Usady is located 59 km east of Gus-Khrustalny (the district's administrative centre) by road. Dobryatino is the nearest rural locality.

References 

Rural localities in Gus-Khrustalny District